Gómez Suárez de Figueroa may refer to:

 Gómez Suárez de Figueroa, also known as Garcilaso de la Vega, 16th-century historian
 Gomez Suarez de Figueroa of Cordova, 1st Duke of Feria, Spanish nobleman in the reign of Philip II
 Gómez Suárez de Figueroa, 3rd Duke of Feria (1587–1634), Spanish nobleman and soldier